Xinxiu station is a metro station on Line 2 of the Shenzhen Metro. It opened on 28 June 2011. This station served as the terminus of the line until the extension through Line 8 via Liantang to Yantian Road on 28 October 2020 (28-10-2020).

Station layout

Exits

References

Shenzhen Metro stations
Railway stations in Guangdong
Luohu District
Railway stations in China opened in 2011